Casey Lee Atwood (born August 25, 1980) is an American former stock car racing driver. A former competitor in NASCAR competition, he is the youngest pole winner in Busch Series history, earning a pole start at the age of 17.

Atwood had his most success in the Busch Series in 1999 and 2000, driving the No. 27 Chevrolet for Brewco Motorsports. Atwood's performance led many to label him as "the next Jeff Gordon," and landed him a factory-backed Dodge ride in the Winston Cup Series with Evernham Motorsports for 2001. His struggles at the Cup level over two seasons, however, derailed his career, with his last Cup start coming in 2003 at the young age of 22. After spending parts of seven seasons back in the Busch Series, Atwood's national series career ended in 2009.

Early life
Growing up in Antioch, Tennessee outside of Nashville, Atwood became interested in racing at a young age. By the age of ten, Atwood was racing go-karts.  He later progressed to Late Model Stock racing by the age of 15. He was the 1996 rookie of the year at Nashville Speedway USA. Casey attended John Overton High School in Nashville until he dropped out in 1999 to pursue his racing career.

NASCAR career

Busch Series
Atwood debuted in the NASCAR Busch Series in 1998 at North Carolina Speedway with a modest 21st-place finish, but stunned the racing world upon his next attempt. At his home track Nashville Speedway in March, the 17-year-old Atwood qualified on the pole position, making him the youngest pole winner in NASCAR history, a record that still stands in the Busch/Nationwide/Xfinity series, but in NASCAR in total, it had been surpassed in 2014 by a 16-year-old Cole Custer in the Truck Series. A brilliant performance would follow, as Atwood led 104 laps and ultimately brought his No. 28 Red Line Oil-sponsored Chevrolet home in second-place to Mike McLaughlin. Atwood made sporadic starts over the course of the year, none equal to his second race, but after moving from Larry Lockamy's part-time team to Hensley Racing in September, the driver had strong showings at Atlanta (where he started 36th but made his way to the front) and Homestead (where he claimed his second pole). By the end of 1998, he had won two poles and five Top 20s in 13 races.

In 1999, he joined the Brewco Motorsports No. 27 Castrol GTX-sponsored Chevrolet team for his first full season in the NASCAR Busch Series. Atwood flipped during the first race of the season at Daytona International Speedway, after he was tapped by Andy Hillenburg coming to the white flag. Atwood became the youngest winner in Busch Series History when he won at the Milwaukee Mile at the age of 18 on July 4, 1999, which would stand until Joey Logano bested Atwood's mark by winning the Meijer 300 at Kentucky Speedway on June 14, 2008 at the age of 18 years and 21 days. Atwood won another race at Dover in September and scored two pole starts. He finished 1999 with two wins, five Top 5s and nine Top 10s. He finished 13th in points. 2000 proved to be another good year for Atwood, as he managed to have two poles and eight top 10s, finishing eighth in points.

Winston Cup

In 2000, Atwood made his Winston Cup debut in a No. 19 Motorola-sponsored Ford for Ray Evernham at Richmond International Raceway. He started 35th and finished 19th, two laps down. He made two more starts that year and earned his first Top 10, a 10th at Homestead. Atwood moved up to NASCAR Winston Cup full-time in 2001 in the No. 19 Dodge Dealers/UAW-sponsored car for Evernham's team Evernham Motorsports, a newly formed team under the Dodge banner, to compete for Rookie of the Year honors. Atwood was the youngest driver in the series in 2001. He was nicknamed the "Next Jeff Gordon," due to Gordon's similar rise from Busch to Cup at a young age, and was teammate to former Cup Champion, Bill Elliott.  Atwood struggled through the year, but improved as the season went on, winning the pole at Phoenix and was in contention to win the race, while leading the race a flat tire slowed his day as he was only able to make it back to 14th place by the end of the race. A week later at the season finale at Homestead, he was leading with five laps to go, but was passed by Elliott and Michael Waltrip. Atwood would place third, his career-best Cup finish. Atwood also finished third in the Winston Cup Rookie of the Year standings (behind future Cup champions Kevin Harvick and Kurt Busch), and 26th in Cup standings.

In 2002, with the signing of Jeremy Mayfield to drive the No. 19, Atwood moved from Evernham's team to the No. 7 of Ultra Motorsports as part of an alliance between Evernham and Ultra owner Jim Smith, where Smith's team would switch from Ford to Dodge and receive equipment and engines from Evernham. The team was known as Ultra-Evernham Motorsports, and sponsored by Sirius Satellite Radio. Atwood struggled throughout the year, having zero Top 10s, and just one Top 10 qualifying effort and finishing 35th in points. With two races left in the season, he was fired by Jim Smith (which also brought an abrupt end to the Ultra/Evernham partnership) and was replaced by Jason Leffler for the rest of 2002, and later Jimmy Spencer in 2003. Atwood ran the last race of the year in Evernham's No. 91 Dodge and qualified 12th, but finished poorly.  Also during 2002, Atwood drove an Evernham ARCA car bearing his former No. 19 at Pocono and dominated, winning the race from the pole.

In 2003, he drove Evernham's No. 91 research and development car for two races. At Pocono Raceway with sponsorship from Mountain Dew LiveWire, Atwood finished 40th after engine troubles. He also ran in the Brickyard 400 without sponsorship, but was only able to muster a 31st-place finish. Atwood's most recent appearance in the series was a failed qualifying attempt in the No. 95 car for the 2006 Ford 400 at Homestead. He was driving a Brewco-prepared Scott Towels/Kleenex-sponsored Ford for Stanton Barrett.

Return to Busch/Nationwide

After his release from Evernham Motorsports in the Cup Series, Atwood was expected to return to Brewco's 27 (recently vacated by Jamie McMurray), but the ride instead went to Chase Montgomery and Joey Clanton. Beginning at Kentucky in June 2003, Atwood drove the No. 14 Navy-sponsored Chevrolet for FitzBradshaw Racing, a second car for the team. Atwood also ran three races in the team's third No. 82 Chevy. Atwood returned to the No. 14 full-time for FitzBradshaw in 2004. Atwood scored seven top ten finishes, but was inconsistent outside of those races. He nearly won at Richmond in September, leading 83 laps, but was tapped by Martin Truex Jr. with less than ten laps to go, allowing Robby Gordon to win. Atwood would finish second in the race. Atwood was diagnosed by owner Armando Fitz of having "a lack of confidence and no aggression on the race track", proceeding to hire a psychologist for the driver. Atwood was released from the team with five races remaining in the season, replaced by Chip Ganassi Racing development driver David Stremme (Fitz was the son-in-law of CGR co-owner Felix Sabates). Atwood was 13th in points at the time, and he fell back to 19th by the end of the season. In 2005, he drove four races for Evernham Motorsports in the No. 6 Unilever Dodge.

In early to mid-2006, Atwood practiced and qualified the No. 18 Joe Gibbs Racing Chevrolet for J. J. Yeley in select races, due to conflicts with Yeley's Nextel Cup Series schedule. Atwood would also occupy this role in 2009 for Kyle Busch. Atwood would later say that these cars, prepared by former Brewco mechanic Jason Ratcliff, were the best he'd ever driven. Beginning at Richmond in September, he returned to the No. 27 car for Brewco Motorsports for the rest of 2006. Atwood was replaced by Ward Burton in the No. 27 car at Brewco for 2007. After a year away from the sport, he returned to Brewco (then known as Baker-Curb Racing) to pilot the 27 car in 2008. In 2009, Atwood qualified for 20 races in the No. 05 car for Wayne Day, and finished 44th in points.
At Phoenix, he was involved in a grinding crash in which he took three separate hits. Atwood sustained minor injuries, and has not raced since (His injuries did not bring about the end of his career).

Craftsman Truck Series
Atwood first appeared on the NASCAR scene in 1996, at the age of 16, in a Craftsman Truck Series race at Nashville Speedway USA. He finished 32nd in the No. 48 STP-sponsored Chevrolet. In 2005, Atwood was picked up by Bobby Hamilton Racing to drive the first three races of the Craftsman Truck Series season in the No. 4 Bailey's Cigarettes-sponsored Dodge. Atwood ran well during the three race stint, but scored no top tens.

Post-NASCAR career
After three years away from racing, Atwood returned to competition in 2012, competing in late model competition at Nashville Fairgrounds Speedway in a car owned by Sterling Marlin.

Personal life

Atwood currently resides in Nashville. He married his longtime girlfriend, Laura, in 2005. They have two daughters together.

Motorsports career results

NASCAR
(key) (Bold – Pole position awarded by qualifying time. Italics – Pole position earned by points standings or practice time. * – Most laps led.)

Nextel Cup Series

Daytona 500

Nationwide Series

Craftsman Truck Series

ARCA Re/Max Series
(key) (Bold – Pole position awarded by qualifying time. Italics – Pole position earned by points standings or practice time. * – Most laps led.)

* Season still in progress
1 Ineligible for series points

References

External links
 

Living people
1980 births
People from Antioch, Tennessee
Racing drivers from Nashville, Tennessee
Racing drivers from Tennessee
NASCAR drivers
ARCA Menards Series drivers
Evernham Motorsports drivers